{{Infobox station
| name          = Leiden Centraal
| type          = 
| style         = NS
| image         = Leiden Centraal Station 6838.jpg
| image_size    = 
| image_caption = Leiden Centraal railway station
| address       = Leiden, South Holland, 
| coordinates   = 
| line          = Amsterdam–Rotterdam railway  Weesp–Leiden railwayWoerden–Leiden railway
| other         = 
| structure     = 
| platform      = 6
| depth         = 
| levels        = 
| tracks        = 10
| parking       = 
| bicycle       = 
| baggage_check = 
| opened        = 17 August 1842
| closed        = 
| rebuilt       = 
| electrified   = 
| ADA           = 
| code          = 
| owned         = Nederlandse Spoorwegen
| zone          = 
| smartcardname = 
| smartcardstatus = 
| former        = 
| passengers    = 
| pass_year     = 
| pass_percent  = 
| pass_system   = 
| mpassengers   = 
| connections   =  Arriva: 1, 2, 3, 4, 5, 6, 20, 21, 30, 31, 37, 38, 45 (shared with EBS), 50, 56, 57, 169, 182, 183, 186, 187, 221, 250, 269, 365, 400, 510, 854   EBS: 43, 45 (shared with Arriva)
| services_collapsible=yes
| services      = 
| map_type = Netherlands Randstad ZW#Netherlands
}}Leiden Centraal' is the main railway station in Leiden, a city in the Netherlands.

History

Leiden Centraal station opened on 17 August 1842 as the southern terminal of the first expansion of the Old Line (Dutch: Oude Lijn) from Haarlem. The original building was replaced by a new one, designed by D.A.N. Margadant, in 1879. In 1910, two of the greatest minds in European culture - Sigmund Freud, the father of psychoanalysis, and Gustav Mahler, the world-famous Austrian conductor and composer - met at Leiden station. Dirk Margadant|

This station was later razed and replaced by a third station designed by HGJ Schelling. Due to its post-war design, which was also implemented at other Dutch railway stations, Leiden Centraal became synonymous with the word "ugly." Increasing numbers of passengers also caused the building to become overcrowded. Eventually, it was demolished.

The fourth, and current, station was designed by Harry Reijnders and completed in 1996. Consisting of a white lattice structure, a curved, shell-like entrance leads into a ticketing hall lined with shops and restaurants. When first built, the floor had a bright blue and white finish. Problems with passengers slipping required that the floor be replaced with standard tiling.

Smart card era
In 2007, Leiden Centraal was renovated in accordance with the introduction of the OV-chipkaart, which created a nationwide smart card fare system. To implement the OV-chipkaart, ticket barriers were installed, separating the station into a paid and unpaid area. The platforms, waiting area, and several shops comprise the paid area, while the rest of the station (including ticket machines and other shops) is classified as unpaid. As of 2017 the barriers are no longer open, as the new ticket system is now mandatory

Accidents and incidents
On 28 November 2011, a Sprinter collided with a stationary Sprinter. Three passengers were injured.

Train services
, the following train services call at this station:
1x per hour night train (nachtnet) service Rotterdam - (Gouda -) The Hague - Amsterdam - Utrecht (Only on night after Wednesday and Thursday via Gouda)
1x per hour Intercity service The Hague - Leiden - Schiphol - Duivendrecht - Lelystad - Zwolle - Groningen
1x per hour Intercity service The Hague - Leiden - Schiphol - Duivendrecht - Lelystad - Zwolle - Leeuwarden
2x per hour Intercity service Amsterdam - Haarlem - Leiden - The Hague (Not after 22.00)
2x per hour Intercity service Amsterdam - Haarlem - Leiden - The Hague - Rotterdam - Dordrecht - Roosendaal - Vlissingen
2x per hour Intercity service Lelystad - Almere - Amsterdam - Schiphol - Leiden - The Hague - Rotterdam - Dordrecht (Not after 20.00 and on Sundays)
2x per hour Intercity service Leiden - Alphen aan den Rijn - Utrecht
2x per hour Intercity service Dordrecht - Rotterdam - The Hague - Leiden - Schiphol - Utrecht - 's Hertogenbosch - Eindhoven - Venlo (after 20.00 and on Sundays)
2x per hour local service (Sprinter) Hoorn - Zaandam - Amsterdam - Schiphol - Hoofdorp (- Leiden) (After 20.00 not to Leiden)
2x per hour local service (Sprinter) The Hague - Leiden - Schiphol - Amsterdam (Connected to sprinter in direction Zwolle at Amsterdam Centraal)
2x per hour local service (Sprinter) (The Hague -) Leiden - Haarlem (After 20.00 not to The Hague)
2x per hour local service (Sprinter'') Leiden - Alphen aan den Rijn, only in rushhours and an hour before and after rushhours.

Bus services
For the bus services the responsible companies are Arriva and Veolia Transport.

Gallery

References

External links
NS website
Dutch Public Transport journey planner

Railway stations in South Holland
Buildings and structures in Leiden
Railway stations on the Oude Lijn
1842 establishments in the Netherlands
Railway stations in the Netherlands opened in 1842